Dublin North-West is a parliamentary constituency represented in Dáil Éireann, the lower house of the Irish parliament or Oireachtas. The constituency elects 3 deputies (Teachtaí Dála, commonly known as TDs) on the system of proportional representation by means of the single transferable vote (PR-STV).

History and boundaries
The first constituency of this name was created by the Government of Ireland Act 1920 as a 4-seat constituency for the Southern Ireland House of Commons and a 1-seat constituency for the United Kingdom House of Commons at Westminster, combining the former Westminster constituencies of Dublin Clontarf, Dublin St James's and Dublin St Michan's. At the 1921 election for the Southern Ireland House of Commons, the seats were won uncontested by Sinn Féin, who treated it as part of the election to the Second Dáil. It was never used as a Westminster constituency; under s. 1(4) of the Irish Free State (Agreement) Act 1922, no writ was to be issued "for a constituency in Ireland other than a constituency in Northern Ireland". Therefore, no vote was held in Dublin North-West at the 1922 United Kingdom general election on 15 November 1922, shortly before the Irish Free State left the United Kingdom on 6 December 1922.

Under the Electoral Act 1923, which took effect at the 1923 general election, the area was divided between the constituencies of Dublin City North and Dublin City South.

A second constituency with this name was created by the Electoral (Revision of Constituencies) Act 1935, dividing the old Dublin City North constituency into Dublin North-West and Dublin North-East, and first used at the 1937 general election. It was abolished in 1977, under the Electoral (Amendment) Act 1974, with most of the constituency going to the new constituency of Dublin Finglas with a smaller but significant portion going to a new Dublin Cabra constituency.

A third constituency with this name was created in the north-western area of the city by the Electoral (Amendment) Act 1980 and first used at the 1981 general election. The constituency is overwhelmingly urban; it encompasses Ballymun, Finglas and parts of Glasnevin (Ballygall) in the local government area of Dublin City, together with the Santry area of Fingal and the area of Whitehall to the west of Swords Road.

The Electoral (Amendment) (Dáil Constituencies) Act 2017 defines the constituency as:

TDs

TDs 1921–1923

TDs 1937–1977

TDs since 1981

Election results

2020 general election

2016 general election

2011 general election

2007 general election

2002 general election

1997 general election

1992 general election

1989 general election

1987 general election

November 1982 general election

February 1982 general election

1981 general election

1973 general election

1969 general election

1965 general election

1961 general election

1957 general election

1954 general election

1952 by-election
Following the death of Independent TD A. P. Byrne, a by-election was held on 12 November 1952. The seat was won by Independent candidate Thomas Byrne, brother of the deceased TD.

The surplus votes of the elected candidate were distributed after being declared elected because there was a possibility another candidate could have reached the threshold of a third of a quota which would have meant their election deposit was returned to them.

1951 general election

1948 general election

1945 by-election
Following the resignation of Fianna Fáil TD Seán T. O'Kelly on his election as President of Ireland, a by-election was held on 4 December 1945. The seat was won by Vivion de Valera, son of the Taoiseach Éamon de Valera.

1944 general election
Full figures for the last nine counts are unavailable. Ó Cuinneagáin, Brack, Cahill and Foley all lost their deposits.

1943 general election
Full figures for the last eleven counts are unavailable. Love, Murray, Ó Cuinneagáin, Staines, Sheppard, Keogh and Macken all lost their deposits.

1938 general election

1937 general election

1922 general election

1921 general election

|}

See also
Elections in the Republic of Ireland
Politics of the Republic of Ireland
List of Dáil by-elections
List of political parties in the Republic of Ireland

References

External links
 Oireachtas Constituency Dashboards
 Oireachtas Members Database
 Dublin Historic Maps: Parliamentary & Dail Constituencies 1780–1969 (a work in progress.)

Dáil constituencies
Parliamentary constituencies in County Dublin
Politics of Fingal
1921 establishments in Ireland
1923 disestablishments in Ireland
Constituencies established in 1921
Constituencies disestablished in 1923
1937 establishments in Ireland
1977 disestablishments in Ireland
Constituencies established in 1937
Constituencies disestablished in 1977
1981 establishments in Ireland
Constituencies established in 1981
Politics of Dublin (city)